Suyash Panday (born 26 September 1962), better known by his stage name Chunky Panday, is an Indian actor who works in Bollywood films. He has appeared in over 100 films in a career that has spanned over three decades.

His most successful films in Hindi were in the period 1987-1994. After the failure of his Hindi films as lead hero since 1994, his career in Hindi films faded away. He then worked in Bangladeshi cinema from 1995 and most of his films in Bangladesh were successful. He has been acting as a character actor since 2003 in Hindi films.

He is the father of actress Ananya Panday.

Early life

Panday was born as Suyash Panday on 26 September 1962 in Bombay.

Career 
Panday worked as an instructor in acting school in 1986. He used to be senior to many junior budding artists such as Akshay Kumar.

1987–1993: Debut and early success

Panday debuted his acting career with the 1987 multi-starer film Aag Hi Aag opposite Neelam Kothari. Film producer Pahlaj Nihalani gave Panday his first break in 1987 by signing him up for two films, his debut film and Paap Ki Duniya. His second successful film was Paap Ki Duniya with Sunny Deol and Neelam. Subsequently, Panday appeared in many multi-hero films from 1987 to 1993. In 1988, Panday was appreciated for his supporting role in N. Chandra's film Tezaab featuring Anil Kapoor and Madhuri Dixit. Panday played the character of Babban, Munna's (Anil Kapoor) friend. For his performance in Tezaab, Panday was nominated for the Filmfare Award for the Best Supporting Actor.

Since then he has appeared in many films with mixed success throughout the late 1980s and 1990s. Most of his films where he had the leading role did not fare well at the box office from 1992. In most films, he was cast in supporting roles to senior actors like Rajesh Khanna, Dharmendra, Jeetendra, Sunny Deol and Sanjay Dutt. Some of those hit films with him in second lead, are Paap Ki Duniya (1988), Khatron Ke Khiladi (1988), Ghar Ka Chiraag (1989), Nakabandi, Zahreelay (1990), Rupaye Dus Karod, Vishwatma (1992), Lootere (1993) and Aankhen (1993). His solo hit was Parda Hai Parda (1992).

1994–2003: Career slump and hiatus
The advent of the 1990s saw a new wave of actors like Aamir Khan, Salman Khan and Shah Rukh Khan taking on roles as "romantic heroes", while Akshay Kumar, Suniel Shetty and Ajay Devgan grabbed the "action hero" roles. Panday found it difficult to slot himself in either category. In addition, by the late nineties, solo-hero films were back in vogue instead of the multi-hero films in which Panday was generally cast and Panday was not seen as a marketable hero for solo hero films.

Panday grew increasingly tired of playing second fiddle to more prominent actors, but had difficulty being seen as marketable, other than supporting household names. "I was offered hero ke bhai ka (lead actor's brother) roles," he said. "I (told them), 'Boss, not happening.'" He moved to act as hero in Bangladesh films. In 1995, he was offered his first films as the lead hero in Bangladeshi films. He acted in six films between 1995 and 1997 as hero in Bangladesh and all of them were successful. Between 1997 and 2002, he received minimal work in Bollywood, playing supporting roles in low-budget films like Tirchhi Topiwale, Yeh Hai Mumbai Meri Jaan, Kaun Rokega Mujhe and Jwalamukhi.

2003 to present: Return to Bollywood
Panday returned to Bollywood in 2003 playing minor supporting roles in Qayamat: City Under Threat, Elaan, Don: The Chase Begins Again and Apna Sapna Money Money.

In 2005, he played an underworld gangster in the Ram Gopal Varma film D – Underworld Badshah. Later, director Ram Gopal Varma roped him in for Darwaaza Bandh Rakho, a dark comedy thriller in which he played one of four robbers who hold a family hostage.

Panday played the role of the Indo-Italian "Aakhiri Pasta" in the 2010 comedy hit Housefull followed by his reprised roles in the sequels Housefull 2 in 2012, Housefull 3 in 2016 and in Housefull 4 in 2019.

In regards to his film selection since returning to acting in Bollywood, Panday has stated that he prefers not to play a hero nowadays because there is less pressure on him if the film fails and it's much more fun playing interesting characters and showing his range.

While Panday's second stint in Bollywood has mainly consisted of starring as a character actor, he doesn't want to be pigeonholed into only doing comic roles. "I don't think I am restricting myself to doing only comedy. I am hoping that someone offers me something else... It requires a lot of guts for someone to cast me in something else. I am just hoping that someone sees something else in me other than comedy."

This hope was realised with Panday starring as villains in the films Begum Jaan, Prassthanam, Saaho and web series Abhay.

Personal life
Panday married Bhavana Panday in January 1998. They have two daughters, Ananya, an actress, and Rysa.

Filmography

Films

Web series

Awards and nominations

References

External links 

 
 
 

Living people
1962 births
Indian male film actors
Male actors in Hindi cinema
Male actors from Mumbai
20th-century Indian male actors
21st-century Indian male actors